Christchankeith "Ckay1" Marshall is an American music composer, arranger, and producer. Ckay1's first full credit production work was in 2006 on Light Poles and Pine Trees for Hip hop group Field Mob. This release reached No. 7 on the US Billboard 200 and No. 2 on Top R&B/Hip Hop Albums

Early life
Born and raised in Nigeria, Ckay1 began his acting and music careers at an early age. By the age of 11, he had become a familiar face throughout the acting community. He has played numerous onstage roles at the historical Dock Street Theatre and The Charleston Youth Company, as well as an independent feature film titled Mother of the River, and Alex Haley's Queen starring Halle Berry. In middle school, Marshall began playing the violin, and upon entering Academic Magnet High School, he began playing the bass guitar, where he became a brief member of a local band that performed in the Tri-State area.

Education
Upon high school graduation, Marshall received a full academic scholarship to Florida A&M University in Tallahassee, Florida. He was a member of the Hatchett Pre-law Society, The National Society of Collegiate Scholars, Phi Alpha Delta, and Alpha Phi Alpha fraternity. Marshall graduated magna cum laude from FAMU in 2004 with his B.A in Political Science with a minor in Spanish.

Career
While in Tallahassee, Florida, Ckay1 produced music for a wide variety of local and independent artists including, but not limited to "Thrill Da Playa" of the 69 Boyz. However, it was not until his independent release of the Gold Album (a mashup album created by coupling an a cappella version of rapper Jay-Z's The Black Album with instrumentals created from a variety of unauthorized samples) that he garnered the attention of Shawn Jay and Smoke of Field Mob, of whom had recently signed a deal with DTP Records, Geffen Records. Their relationship led to his first major released production credit with 'Area Code 229' with the 2006 release of Light Poles and Pine Trees. As of 2008, he resided in Atlanta, Georgia. He is currently in Los Angeles, California, and is represented by the firm Mark Music & Media Law located in Beverly Hills, California. Ckay1 is also the owner of N.O.T.E Productions, L.L.C, a music production company serving the music and film industries.

Discography and credits

References

External links

1982 births
American hip hop record producers
American multi-instrumentalists
Def Jam Recordings artists
Living people
Rappers from South Carolina
Musicians from Charleston, South Carolina
Florida A&M University alumni
Musicians from South Carolina
21st-century American rappers